Joaquín de Agüero Airport , also known as Santa Lucía Airport, is an airport serving Playa Santa Lucía, a village of Nuevitas, in the Camagüey Province of Cuba.

Facilities

References

External links
 

Airports in Cuba
Nuevitas
Buildings and structures in Camagüey Province